Astwood may refer to:

 Astwood, Buckinghamshire, a village and civil parish in the Borough of Milton Keynes, England
 Astwood (surname)
 Astwood, Worcester, Worcestershire, a location in England
 Astwood, Wychavon, Worcestershire, a location in England
 Astwood Bank, Worcestershire, England